Asser Mbai (born 1950 in Otjiwarongo) is a Namibian politician who was the President of the National Unity Democratic Organization (NUDO) from 2014 to 2019. He has been a member of the National Assembly of Namibia since 2005 after succeeding Kuaima Riruako as President of NUDO following  the latter's death on 2 June 2014.

Political career
Mbai replaced Mburumba Kerina in the National Assembly following Kerina's fall out with the party over the use of government funds. Prior to his election to the National Assembly, he was a regional councillor for Okakarara.

References

1950 births
Living people
Members of the National Assembly (Namibia)
National Unity Democratic Organisation politicians
People from Otjiwarongo
Candidates for President of Namibia